"Sugar Honey Ice & Tea" is a song by British rock band Bring Me the Horizon. Produced by the band's vocalist Oliver Sykes and keyboardist Jordan Fish, it is featured on the group's 2019 sixth studio album Amo. The track was released as the sixth single from the album on 26 July 2019. The title is a euphemism and acronym for "shit".

Composition
"Sugar Honey Ice & Tea" has been described as a pop metal song.''

Promotion and release
The track was shared by the band through cryptic clips on their social media accounts. These cryptic clips showed someone applying makeup on themselves in a weird manner with the caption reading "tomorrow". This would immediately stir up interest which had the band release the official video for "Sugar Honey Ice & Tea" the following day, alongside the scheduled single on 26 July 2019.

Music video
The official video for the song was released alongside the single on 26 July 2019. It was directed by frontman and primary songwriter, Oliver Sykes, and Brian Cox. The video would feature various different live performances of the band performing the song live, as well as other unsettling trippy imagery and animation to intertwine with the song alongside Sykes performing the song on guitar in a green screen area.

Charts

Certifications

References

2019 singles
2019 songs
Bring Me the Horizon songs
Songs written by Oliver Sykes
RCA Records singles
Sony Music singles